Runaway Bay may refer to:

 Runaway Bay, Jamaica
 Runaway Bay, Queensland, Australia, a suburb of Gold Coast City
 Runaway Bay, Texas, United States
 Runaway Bay (TV series), children's television series
 Runaway Bay, ship